Supriya Pathare is a Marathi television, theatre, and film actress. She is known for her portrayal in Pudhcha Paaul as Kanchanmala & Honar Sun Me Hya Gharchi as Mothi Aai. She had participated in Fu Bai Fu as a contestant. Currently, she is playing the character of Maai in Thipkyanchi Rangoli.

Personal life
Pathare is married and has two children, a boy and a girl. Settled in Thane. His son is return from United States after completion of study then he started Pav bhaji truck named as 'Mharaj' in Thane.

Career
Pathare was born at Umarkhadi in Sandhurst Road, Mumbai. There was no background of acting in her family. She was extremely active in theatre from school days and also wrote a script when in the 7th Standard. Tin Paishancha Tamasha was a play where many amateur actors tried their luck and Supriya used this opportunity to fine tune her acting skills with the help of her Guru Waman Kendre. Kickstarting her career with the Marathi Play Darling, Darling. Darling, Darling was Supriya's first commercial play. Over sixteen years, Supriya performed in a number of plays and has made a mark in the acting fraternity.

Supriya has also managed to show her talent as comedian by acting in a comedy reality show Fu Bai Fu. She has played different role types, negative characters, loving motherly characters as well as comedy standup actor in Fu Bai Fu, which she won with Bhau Kadam in one year. Supriya was appearing in a Marathi serial, Honar Sun Me Hya Gharchi. She also acted in and is famous for her cast in Pudhcha Paaul as "Kanchanmala Randive" or Kanchanmala Bai as Akkasaheb called her. This was a negative role.

Supriya Pathare claimed that she was held "captive" for three months by a producer in Rajasthan during the shooting of a film and was rescued at the intervention of late Shiv Sena chief Bal Thackeray.

Filmography

Films

Television

Plays
Darling, Darling
Hich Majhi Rani

Awards
 Natya Darpan Puraskar for play Darling Darling
 Best Mother-in-law in Zee Marathi Utsav Natyancha Awards 2015

References

External links
 

Living people
Marathi people
Actresses in Marathi cinema
Actresses in Marathi theatre
1972 births
Actresses from Mumbai